Antispila corniella is a moth of the family Heliozelidae. It was described by Kuroko in 1961. It is found in Japan (Kyushu).

The wingspan is 5–6 mm. The forewings are dark bronzy fuscous with brassy reflections, becoming purplish reflections on the apical half. The basal area is shining leaden-fuscous and the makings are silvery-metallic with yellow or bluish reflections. The hindwings are pale fuscous with feeble purplish lusters. Adult moths usually appear from the end of July to August. Annually, the successive generations replaces the previous generations.

The larvae feed on Cornus controversa and Cornus brachypoda. They mine the leaves of their host plant. The mine has the form of a full depth linear-blotch. It is whitish, semitransparent and extends in a line along the leaf margin or in a wavy line. The mine gradually becomes broader. After the third moult, the mine develops into a whitish green blotch. One or two mines may be found in a single leaf. The frass is blackish and is deposited in a line in the linear portion of the mine. In the blotch it appearing like a large black patch in the middle of the mine. Larvae can be found from September to October. Full-grown larvae cut out a case from the end of the mine and descend to the ground. They hibernate within this case. Pupation occurs at the beginning of June of the following year.

References

Moths described in 1961
Heliozelidae
Moths of Japan